The R463 road is a regional road in Ireland which runs north-south from the R352 at Tuamgraney, County Clare to Limerick city centre. The road passes on its way through Killaloe and O'Briensbridge.

See also
 Roads in Ireland
 National primary road
 National secondary road

References
Roads Act 1993 (Classification of Regional Roads) Order 2006 – Department of Transport

Regional roads in the Republic of Ireland
Roads in County Limerick
Roads in County Clare